The  is an AC electric multiple unit (EMU) train type operated on local services by Kyushu Railway Company (JR Kyushu) in Japan since 1999.

Design
The 815 series was the first aluminium-alloy EMU to be ordered by JR Kyushu, and was designed to be lighter than the earlier 813 series design. The trains were introduced on wanman driver only operation services, replacing ageing 423, 457, and 475 series rolling stock.

History
A total of 26 2-car sets (52 cars) were delivered to Kumamoto and Ōita depots between May and October 1999.

Kumamoto set N015 was renumbered N027 in February 2000.

Formation

The KuMoHa 815 car is fitted with a PS401K single-arm pantograph.

Interior
Seating is longitudinal throughout. The KuMoHa 815 car has a toilet, and the KuHa 814 car is fitted with a wheelchair space.

References

Electric multiple units of Japan
Kyushu Railway Company
Hitachi multiple units
Train-related introductions in 1999
20 kV AC multiple units